Kazem Hamd (also Romanized as  Kāz̧em Ḩamd; also known as Kāz̧em Aḩmad, Kāz̧em Aḩmad-e Laţīfī, and Kāzim Ahmad) is a village in Seyyed Abbas Rural District, Shavur District, Shush County, Khuzestan Province, Iran. At the 2006 census, its population was 716, in 111 families.

References 

Populated places in Shush County